The Battle of Theiningen was a battle in Germany fought on 22–23 August 1796 during the War of the First Coalition in which a French division, led by Jean-Baptiste Bernadotte, repulsed an attempted encirclement, and fought a successful rearguard action, despite being outnumbered three-to-one, against an Austrian army led by Archduke Charles of Austria, allowing the French Army of Sambre and Meuse to retreat toward the Rhine.

Prelude

During July 1796, The French Army of Sambre and Meuse, and the Army of the Rhine and Moselle had begun the Rhine Campaign of 1796 against Austrian forces located in Southern Germany. After some success in its advance toward Bohemia, including the fall of Mannheim and Nuremberg, the Austrians regrouped and were reinforced and now outnumbered the French in the theater of operations. The Archduke Charles, perhaps the Austrians' finest military mind, had engaged in fabian tactics to preserve his forces until reinforcements allowed him to turn to the offensive.

With Austrian resistance stiffening, and intelligence that Charles had been massively reinforced, French General Jean-Baptiste Jourdan now saw need to protect his right flank. Jourdan ordered Bernadotte's division of 9,000 men to protect the Southern, right flank of the Army and to prevent the Austrians from cutting off the Army's line of retreat to the Rhine. Bernadotte's division began its movement South toward Ratisbon. Realizing that a single division would be inadequate for the task, Jourdan ordered Jacques Philippe Bonnaud to lead a cavalry division to rendezvous with Bernadotte.

Following his victory at the Battle of Neresheim on 11 August, Archduke Charles began planning a large counter-offensive against the French and began concentrating his forces for an attack on Jourdan, looking for opportunities to engage the French on unequal terms.

On 20 August 1796, Bernadotte marched from Altdorf toward Theiningen on the Ratisbon road when his troops encountered the outposts of the Austrian vanguard. A running fight began in which Bernadotte's division cut across the Austrian line of communications, cut off the Austrian vanguard from the main body and arrived at Theiningen later that evening. It was only then that Bernadotte was made aware that General Bonnaud's division was no where near and would not arrive anytime soon.

Meanwhile, Archduke Charles upon hearing of Bernadotte's thrust South, rushed his main body of 20,000 toward Theiningen in the hopes of destroying the isolated French force. Thus unsupported by Bonnaud, Bernadotte's division had effectively walked into a trap.

Battle
On 21 August the Austrian vanguard made contact with Bernadotte's outposts on the Ratisbon road near Theiningen. The French forces fell back toward Theiningen and placed itself on the heights outside the town. According to the noted military theorist Antoine-Henri Jomini the position was a strong and well selected one. The Austrians and the French took the remainder of the day to prepare for the coming battle. Archduke Charles arrived with his main body of the Austrian army, some 20,000 strong, fusing them with his vanguard and other elements later in the day. By nightfall there were now 28,000 Austrians facing 9,000 French.

Archduke Charles began placing his troops for an assault in the morning, though he was unsure of the numbers of the French ahead of him. Bernadotte used the evening to perfect his dispositions and as 22 August dawned the French lined up for battle in a manner that masked their true numbers.

The day started with an Austrian assault against the center of the line; the first of many. Numerous assaults followed with Archduke Charles resolved to destroy the badly outnumbered French force. The battle swayed back and forth and the village changed hands several times. General Jean Sarrazin, who took part in the battle, later described the  conflict:

The counter-attack nearly broke the Austrian line and checked the Austrian assault until darkness fell. That evening, Bernadotte's division withdrew under the cover of night and retreated to Neumarkt. The following day, 23 August, the Austrians pursued Bernadotte's division without effect. Bernadotte took care to hide his numbers by way of effective cavalry screen and gave the Archduke Charles the impression that his command was larger than it really was. As a consequence, Charles' movements were deliberate and time consuming, allowing the French to retreat toward Nuremberg in good order. Bernadotte had slipped the Austrian trap.

Result and Aftermath
Though out-numbering the French three-to-one, the Austrians failed to dislodge the French and suffered heavy casualties in the process. Jomini's opinion was that "with his superior numbers, the Archduke ought to have had no difficulty in annihilating Bernadotte and his division." Further, Bernadotte's bluff in presenting his division as a much larger force caused the Austrians to maneuver as if faced by the whole Army [of the Sambre and Meuse], greatly slowing their pursuit. Bernadotte's slow, days long, retreat North delayed the Austrians and prevented them from cutting off Jourdan's line of retreat following his defeat at the Battle of Amberg. Bernadotte's division later rendezvoused with Jourdan on 27 August who continued to retreat to the Rhine. 

However, Archduke Charles had by then caught up with the French, who then turned and launched a daring counter-stroke, but Jourdan was soundly defeated at the Battle of Würzburg. Despite the setback, the Army of Sambre and Meuse was able to safely cross the Rhine back into France in September 1796. Bernadotte had been wounded by a saber slash to the forehead at Theiningen during the attack on the Austrian center and missed the Battle of Würzburg as a consequence.

For the Archduke Charles the victory at Würzburg, and the retreat of the French armies back across the Rhine, was the culmination of a successful revival of fortune for the arms of Austria following years of defeat at the hands of the upstart French Republic and a personal vindication. With Germany cleared of the French, the Austrians were able to transfer Archduke Charles, as well as thousands of his men, to Italy where the French had enjoyed a great deal of success during the summer under a new, daring young general.

Meanwhile, Bernadotte's rearguard actions against so superior an enemy, and the slipping of the Austrian trap, were highly acclaimed in France as the bright spot of a severe military setback and a summer of frustration against the Austrians. Of the performance of Bernadotte, and his division, Paul Barras, then leader of the French Government, said:

Despite the failure of the French Rhine Campaign of 1796, by late 1797 the Austrians would be forced to sign a peace treaty with the French Republic due to the victories of another French general, Napoleon Bonaparte in Italy, of which, Bernadotte and his division would take part (and face, and defeat, Archduke Charles once more at the Passage of the Tagliamento) following the transfer of 20,000 men under Bernadotte from Jourdan's army to the Army of Italy.

References 

 Barton, Sir Dunbar Plunket (1914). Bernadotte: The First Phase: 1763-1799, John Murray, London.
 Palmer, Alan (1990). Bernadotte: Napoleon's Marshal, Sweden's King, John Murray, London.
 Wencker-Wildberg, Friedrich (1936). Bernadotte: A Biography, Jarrolds Publishers, London.

External links

Conflicts in 1796